Gid Hanasheh ( Gīḏ hanNāše, literally "forgotten sinew", often translated as "displaced tendon") is the term for sciatic nerve in Judaism. It may not be eaten by Jews according to Halacha (Jewish Law). The laws regarding the prohibition of gid hanasheh are found in Tractate Chullin, chapter 7.

Biblical Source
The Torah recounts that Jacob fought with an angel (according to Rashi, this was Esau's guardian angel) who could not beat him. At the end of the fight, the angel strikes a nerve in Jacob's leg, causing him to limp. The verse then states: "Therefore the Israelites do not eat the displaced nerve (gid ha-nasheh) on the hip joint to this very day."

Interpretations
The Zohar explains that the thigh is the root location of sexual desire. While most evil urges can be overcome, there is one lust that is so strong that it overpowers even great men - the gid ha-nasheh. Its very name nasheh means “forgetting” (cf. ), because once this desire has been aroused, we forget all rational thinking and moral scruples. The only way to win this battle is to completely distance ourselves from it. For this reason, the gid ha-nasheh is not eaten at all but entirely avoided.

Rabbi Abraham Isaac Kook explained that the prohibition of eating gid ha-nasheh demonstrates that, while we may need to slaughter animals for our physical needs, we do not seek to subjugate others, whether man or beast. For this reason, we make great efforts to avoid eating the sciatic nerve - a nerve that allows the body to stand upright.

Removal
The removal of the gid hanasheh and chelev (forbidden fats) is called nikkur. Since it is labor-intensive to remove all the forbidden parts of the hindquarters of an animal, the entire hindquarters are usually sold to the non-kosher market, except in Israel and a few other markets with sufficient Jewish populations to justify the expense.

In the situation of a ben pekuah the nerve is permitted to be eaten. This potential reduction in expense is part of a project that began in Melbourne to create a herd of ben pekuah animals.

See also 
Sciatic nerve — non-Hebrew terminology

References

External links

Kashrut
Negative Mitzvoth
Judaism terminology
Hebrew words and phrases in the Hebrew Bible
Hebrew words and phrases in Jewish law